Genzano may refer to a pair of Italian municipalities:

Genzano di Roma, in the Province of Rome
Genzano di Lucania, in the Province of Potenza